Bertry station (French: Gare de Bertry) is a railway station located in the commune of Bertry in the Nord department, France. The station is served by TER Hauts-de-France trains (Douai - Saint-Quentin line).

The old station building was demolished in 2006 during a major redevelopment of the site and replaced by a car park for the station.

See also
List of SNCF stations in Hauts-de-France

References

Railway stations in Nord (French department)
Railway stations in France opened in 1858